Bratrušov is a municipality and village in Šumperk District in the Olomouc Region of the Czech Republic. It has about 600 inhabitants.

Administrative parts
The village of Osikov is an administrative part of Bratrušov.

References

Villages in Šumperk District